Brunswick is a city in southwestern Frederick County, Maryland, United States. The city is located on the north bank of the Potomac River; Loudoun County, Virginia occupies the opposite shore. The population of Brunswick was 7,762 at the 2020 census. There are three schools serving Brunswick: Brunswick Elementary School, Brunswick Middle School, and Brunswick High School.

History 
The area now known as Brunswick was originally home to the Susquehanna Native American Tribe. In 1728 the first settlement was built, and the region became known as Eel Town, because the natives would fish for eel in the Potomac River. A grant to the land was then given to John Hawkins by George II of Great Britain on August 10, 1753. The grant had the name "Hawkins Merry-Peep-o-Day".

The land was sold and Leonard Smith platted it in 1787 with the name of “Berlin,” as many Germans settled in the area. The name “Berlin,” however, could not be used for mail as there was already a Berlin on the Eastern Shore of Maryland, so the post office changed the name to "Barry." The town continued to grow and was incorporated April 18, 1890 with the name “Brunswick.”

Established along the now-defunct Chesapeake and Ohio Canal, the city became a hub for the Baltimore and Ohio Railroad, which built a six-mile-long rail yard along the Potomac from 1891 to 1912, boosting the population to over 5,000, and making Brunswick virtually a company town. The railroad reduced its yard operations in the 1950s.

During Patsy Cline's early career, she performed at the Moose Lodge in Brunswick where she met her first husband, Gerald Cline.

Today Brunswick is home to a commuter rail station serving Washington, D.C. It is home of the Brunswick Heritage Museum which interprets the history of the city and is home of a large model railroad showing why the city's location was important to the railroad.

Tourism 
The largest citywide event is "Railroad Days" on the first weekend in October, a festival celebrating the city's heritage. Another major annual event is the Veterans Day Parade, which has taken place each year since 1932. Other events year round include the Wine and Chocolate Walk in September, Farmers' Market, Arts In The Parks, Little League opening day, and other city and museum events.

The city markets its historic downtown and its access to recreational activities on the C&O Canal and Potomac River. The city's history is preserved in the Brunswick Heritage Museum (formerly the Brunswick Railroad Museum), established in 1974. The historic commercial district of the city along Potomac Street features a bike shop, antique stores, restaurants, a brewpub, a yoga studio, a martial arts studio, a convenience store, and a sporting goods store. There are live music performances many nights of the week at Beans in the Belfry, a café located in the restored former First Evangelical and Reformed Church (built in 1910).

Notable people 
 Andrew Duck – army officer and politician
 Michael Hough – Maryland state senator
 Galen R. Clagett – Maryland politician
 Brendan Lukens – musician and co-founder of Modern Baseball
 Jake Ewald - musician and co-founder of Modern Baseball and Slaughter Beach, Dog

Geography
Brunswick is at  (39.313908, -77.626732).

Business 
Because of the population of Brunswick increasing, many business are being built in Brunswick. Located in Brunswick are a Dollar Tree, Walgreens, Weis Markets, McDonalds, 4 pizza places, a brewing station, and many small businesses with a Holiday Inn Express just built.

Transportation

Highway
The primary method of travel to and from Brunswick is by road. Several state highways serve the city, with the most prominent of these being Maryland Route 17. MD 17 heads south across the Potomac River into Virginia, where it becomes Virginia State Route 287. Just north of Brunswick, MD 17 has junctions with Maryland Route 464, Maryland Route 79, Maryland Route 180, Maryland Route 871 and U.S. Route 340, which provides access to numerous locations across Frederick County. Aside from MD 17, portions of MD 180, MD 464 and Maryland Route 478 also traverse the city.

Railroad
MARC operates commuter trains from Martinsburg, West Virginia, through and stopping at Brunswick then south to Union Station, Washington, D.C.

Demographics

2010 census
As of the 2010 census of 2010, there were 5,870 people, 2,155 households, and 1,515 families living in the city. The racial makeup was 86.3% White, 7.5% African American, 0.2% Native American, 1.7% Asian, 1.2% from other races, and 3.2% from two or more races. Hispanic or Latino of any race were 4.9% of the population.

There were 2,155 households, of which 38.5% had children under the age of 18 living with them, 51.6% were married couples living together, 13.7% had a female householder with no husband present, 5.0% had a male householder with no wife present, and 29.7% were non-families. 23.2% of all households were made up of individuals, and 8.8% had someone living alone who was 65 years of age or older. The average household size was 2.72 and the average family size was 3.22.

The median age in the city was 36.9 years. 27.1% of residents were under the age of 18; 7.9% were between the ages of 18 and 24; 28% were from 25 to 44; 27.3% were from 45 to 64; and 9.8% were 65 years of age or older. The gender makeup was 49.1% male and 50.9% female.

2000 census
As of the census of 2000, there were 4,894 people, 1,866 households, and 1,306 families living in the city. The racial makeup of the city was 92.09% White, 5.31% African American, 0.25% Native American, 0.45% Asian, 0.04% Pacific Islander, 0.18% from other races, and 1.68% from two or more races. Hispanic or Latino of any race were 0.96% of the population.

There were 1,866 households, out of which 36.3% had children under the age of 18 living with them, 50.4% were married couples living together, 14.4% had a female householder with no husband present, and 30.0% were non-families. 23.7% of all households were made up of individuals, and 10.6% had someone living alone who was 65 years of age or older. The average household size was 2.62 and the average family size was 3.11.

In the city, the population was spread out, with 27.3% under the age of 18, 8.4% from 18 to 24, 33.1% from 25 to 44, 20.2% from 45 to 64, and 11.0% who were 65 years of age or older. The median age was 35 years. For every 100 females, there were 93.2 males. For every 100 females age 18 and over, there were 89.5 males.

The median income for a household in the city was $46,513, and the median income for a family was $53,232. Males had a median income of $36,304 versus $25,017 for females. The per capita income was $20,685. About 2.5% of families and 3.7% of the population were below the poverty line, including 4.8% of those under age 18 and 3.5% of those age 65 or over.

Climate data

References

External links

 
 

Cities in Frederick County, Maryland
Cities in Maryland
Maryland populated places on the Potomac River
Company towns in Maryland
Populated places established in 1787
1787 establishments in Maryland